Javier Otxoa Palacios (30 August 1974 – 24 August 2018) was a Spanish cyclist who was a member of the Kelme cycling team. His name was sometimes spelled Javier Ochoa in media reports.

Road cycling career

In 2000 Otxoa won a mountain stage in the Tour de France on top of the Hautacam on a cold and rainy day. Mattan rejoined him on the descent. Otxoa then dropped him again on the climb to the col de l'Aubisque and rode alone through the col du Soulor with nine minutes' lead as he reached the foot of the Hautacam. He paid for his earlier efforts on the hors categorie but held on to finish with 42 seconds advantage Lance Armstrong.

Accident

In February 2001 a driver of a car hit him and his twin brother Ricardo during training. Ricardo died. Javier survived but was in a coma for a month and became seriously disabled. He continued cycling, however.

Paralympics cycling career

In the 2004 Summer Paralympics he won a gold in the road race/time trial event and a silver in the individual pursuit. Otxoa was disqualified during the preliminary round of the individual pursuit (CP 3) at the 2008 Summer Paralympics, for riding too close behind his opponent, Darren Kenny, who had overtaken him. Kenny stated that he was disappointed by this as he would have liked to compete against Otxoa in the final.

At the time of his death in 2018, Otxoa resided in Alhaurín de la Torre, Málaga.

Major results

1996
General Classification Circuito Montañés
2000
13th Tour de France
1st Stage 10
2nd Mountains classification
 1st Prueba Villafranca de Ordizia
2004
1st Road race/time trial, 2004 Summer Paralympics
2nd Pursuit, 2004 Summer Paralympics
2008
1st time trial, 2008 Summer Paralympics
2nd road race, 2008 Summer Paralympics

References

External links
 Javier Otxoa website 
 
 
 
 

1974 births
2018 deaths
Sportspeople from Barakaldo
Cyclists from the Basque Country (autonomous community)
Spanish male cyclists
Spanish Tour de France stage winners
Paralympic cyclists of Spain
Cyclists at the 2004 Summer Paralympics
Paralympic gold medalists for Spain
Paralympic silver medalists for Spain
Cyclists at the 2008 Summer Paralympics
Spanish twins
Twin sportspeople
Medalists at the 2004 Summer Paralympics
Medalists at the 2008 Summer Paralympics
Paralympic medalists in cycling